Chodský Újezd is a municipality and village in Tachov District in the Plzeň Region of the Czech Republic. It has about 800 inhabitants.

Administrative parts
Villages of Dolní Jadruž, Horní Jadruž, Nahý Újezdec, Neblažov, Štokov and Žďár are administrative parts of Chodský Újezd.

References

Villages in Tachov District